The Commerce Bank Championship was a golf tournament on the Champions Tour. It started as non-sanctioned event in 1987, before becoming a regular Senior event in 1988.

The tournament was played annually in either June or July until 2008. It was last played in East Meadow, New York at the Red Course at Eisenhower Park. Commerce Bancorp was the last sponsor of the tournament.

The purse for the 2008 tournament was US$1,600,000, with $240,000 going to the winner.

Winners
Commerce Bank Championship
2008 Loren Roberts
2007 Lonnie Nielsen
2006 John Harris
2005 Ron Streck

Commerce Bank Long Island Classic
2004 Jim Thorpe

Long Island Classic
2003 Jim Thorpe

Lightpath Long Island Classic
2002 Hubert Green
2001 Bobby Wadkins
2000 Bruce Fleisher
1999 Bruce Fleisher

Northville Long Island Classic
1998 Gary Player
1997 Dana Quigley
1996 John Bland
1995 Lee Trevino
1994 Lee Trevino
1993 Raymond Floyd
1992 George Archer
1991 George Archer
1990 George Archer
1989 Butch Baird
1988 Don Bies

Northville Invitational
1987 Gary Player (not Senior PGA Tour event)

Source:

References

External links
PGATOUR.com tournament website

Former PGA Tour Champions events
Golf in New York (state)
Recurring sporting events established in 1987
Recurring events disestablished in 2008